Menshovskoye is a rural locality (a village) in Novlenskoye Rural Settlement, Vologodsky District, Vologda Oblast, Russia. The population was 27 as of 2002.

Geography 
Menshovskoye is located 85 km northwest of Vologda (the district's administrative centre) by road. Minino is the nearest rural locality.

References 

Rural localities in Vologodsky District